Road signs in Kazakhstan are similar to the road sign system of other post-Soviet states that ensure that transport vehicles move safely and orderly, as well as to inform the participants of traffic built-in graphic icons. These icons are governed by the Vienna Convention on Road Traffic and Vienna Convention on Road Signs and Signals.

Gallery

References
 http://www.adcidl.com/pdf/Kazakhstan-Road-Traffic-Signs.pdf

Kazakhstan